Near Dublin is a 1924 American silent comedy film directed by Ralph Ceder and starring Stan Laurel.

Plot
As described in a film magazine review, Stan is a postman in the Irish village and is in love with the belle of the town. His rival is a brick manufacturer who makes bricks for both building and social purposes such as being used by all the Irish men, women, and children in fighting. Stan is thrown into jail on a trumped up charge but escapes and, in a battle with his rival, he is knocked out by a rap on the head. The villain is jailed and Stan wins the affections of the lady.

Cast

See also
 List of American films of 1924

References

External links

1924 films
American silent short films
American black-and-white films
1924 comedy films
1924 short films
Films directed by Ralph Ceder
Silent American comedy films
American comedy short films
1920s American films